Tensed is a city in Benewah County, Idaho, United States. The population was 123 at the 2010 census, down from 126 in 2000. The city is within the Coeur d'Alene Reservation, and is accessed by U.S. Route 95, the state's primary north-south highway. The city is located about 1 mile (0.6 km) from the north entrance of McCroskey State Park.

History
The city was originally called Desmet, after the Belgian Jesuit missionary Pierre-Jean De Smet, who was active with the Coeur d'Alene nation, but the post office requested a change as that name was taken by nearby De Smet. The name was reversed to Temsed and then misspelled by the post office.

Geography

Latah Creek flows half a mile south of Tensed, approximately halfway between the community and the neighboring community of De Smet.

Demographics

2010 census
At the 2010 census there were 123 people in 58 households, including 30 families, in the city. The racial makup of the city was 69.1% White, 24.4% Native American, 0.8% from other races, and 5.7% from two or more races. Hispanic or Latino of any race were 0.8%.

Of the 58 households 29.3% had children under the age of 18 living with them, 32.8% were married couples living together, 19.0% had a female householder with no husband present, and 48.3% were non-families. 37.9% of households were one person and 18.9% were one person aged 65 or older. The average household size was 2.12 and the average family size was 2.80.

The median age was 40.8 years. 25.2% of residents were under the age of 18; 5.7% were between the ages of 18 and 24; 26.9% were from 25 to 44; 15.5% were from 45 to 64; and 26.8% were 65 or older. The gender makeup of the city was 51.2% male and 48.8% female.

2000 census
At the 2000 census there were 126 people in 58 households, including 36 families, in the city. The racial makup of the city was 80.95% White, 14.29% Native American, 0.79% from other races, and 3.97% from two or more races. Hispanic or Latino of any race were 0.79%.

Of the 58 households 22.4% had children under the age of 18 living with them, 53.4% were married couples living together, 3.4% had a female householder with no husband present, and 37.9% were non-families. 36.2% of households were one person and 17.2% were one person aged 65 or older. The average household size was 2.17 and the average family size was 2.78.

The age distribution was 20.6% under the age of 18, 2.4% from 18 to 24, 25.4% from 25 to 44, 31.0% from 45 to 64, and 20.6% 65 or older. The median age was 46 years. For every 100 females, there were 110.0 males. For every 100 females age 18 and over, there were 104.1 males.

The median household income was $18,750 and the median family income  was $25,536. Males had a median income of $21,875 versus $29,250 for females. The per capita income for the city was $11,111. There were 27.0% of families and 37.1% of the population living below the poverty line, including 82.1% of under eighteens and 5.9% of those over 64.

See also
 List of geographic names derived from anagrams and ananyms

References

Cities in Benewah County, Idaho
Cities in Idaho